The NCAA Inspiration Award is awarded to one of the following who is associated with the National Collegiate Athletic Association: a current or former varsity letter-winner, a coach, or an administrator.  The award is given to an individual who "when confronted with a life-altering situation used perseverance, dedication and determination to overcome the event and now serves as a role model to give hope and inspiration to others in similar situations."

The Inspiration Award was first awarded in 2002.  The recipients of the award are:

See also
NCAA Award of Valor
NCAA Sportsmanship Award
NCAA Woman of the Year Award
NCAA Gerald R. Ford Award
Silver Anniversary Awards

References

External links
Official Website

College sports trophies and awards in the United States
Inspiration Award